Elections to Hyndburn Borough Councill were held on Thursday, 3 May 2012. One third of the council was up for election.

Background
Before the election Labour had a single-seat majority of 18 councillors, Conservatives had 14 councillors, while Independent (politician) had 3 councillors.

Labour candidates contested every ward.  Conservative candidates contested all wards except Peel-Ward. 'Various' Independent candidates contested five-wards.  LibDem's just three-candidates contested in Barnfield-ward, Church-ward & Spring Hill-ward. Ukip's only-two candidates contested in Overton-ward & St. Oswalds-ward.

Local Election result
After the election, the composition of the council was -

Labour 23
Conservative 9
Independent 3

NB: Four (of the 16) Council ward seats that were NOT up for re-election in 2012 included the following wards - Clayton Le Moors, Huncoat, Immanuel in Oswaldtwistle and Milnshaw in Accrington.

Ward results

Altham

Barnfield

Baxenden

Central

Church

Netherton

Overton

Peel

Rishton

Spring Hill

St. Andrew's

St. Oswald's

References

https://www.bbc.co.uk/news/special/vote2012/council/E07000120.stm

2012 English local elections
2012
2010s in Lancashire